In control theory, a distributed-parameter system (as opposed to a lumped-parameter system) is a system whose state space is infinite-dimensional. Such systems are therefore also known as infinite-dimensional systems. Typical examples are systems described by partial differential equations or by delay differential equations.

Linear time-invariant distributed-parameter systems

Abstract evolution equations

Discrete-time 
With U, X and Y Hilbert spaces and  ∈ L(X),  ∈ L(U, X),  ∈ L(X, Y) and  ∈ L(U, Y) the following difference equations determine a discrete-time linear time-invariant system:

Continuous-time 
The continuous-time case is similar to the discrete-time case but now one considers differential equations instead of difference equations:
,
.
An added complication now however is that to include interesting physical examples such as partial differential equations and delay differential equations into this abstract framework, one is forced to consider unbounded operators. Usually A is assumed to generate a strongly continuous semigroup on the state space X. Assuming B, C and D to be bounded operators then already allows for the inclusion of many interesting physical examples, but the inclusion of many other interesting physical examples forces unboundedness of B and C as well.

Example: a partial differential equation 

fits into the abstract evolution equation framework described above as follows. The input space U and the output space Y are both chosen to be the set of complex numbers. The state space X is chosen to be  L2(0, 1). The operator A is defined as

It can be shown that A generates a strongly continuous semigroup on X. The bounded operators B, C and D are defined as

Example: a delay differential equation 
The delay differential equation

fits into the abstract evolution equation framework described above as follows. The input space U and the output space Y are both chosen to be the set of complex numbers. The state space X is chosen to be the product of the complex numbers with L2(−τ, 0). The operator A is defined as

It can be shown that A generates a strongly continuous semigroup on X. The bounded operators B, C and D are defined as

Transfer functions 
As in the finite-dimensional case the transfer function is defined through the Laplace transform (continuous-time) or Z-transform (discrete-time). Whereas in the finite-dimensional case the transfer function is a proper rational function, the infinite-dimensionality of the state space leads to irrational functions (which are however still holomorphic).

Discrete-time 
In case 1/z belongs to the resolvent set of A (which is the case on a possibly smaller disc centered at the origin) the transfer function equals . An interesting fact is that any function that is holomorphic in zero is the transfer function of some discrete-time system.

Continuous-time 
To obtain an easy expression for the transfer function it is often better to take the Laplace transform in the given differential equation than to use the state space formulas as illustrated below on the examples given above.

Transfer function for the partial differential equation example 
Setting the initial condition  equal to zero and denoting Laplace transforms with respect to t by capital letters we obtain from the partial differential equation given above

Transfer function for the delay differential equation example 

Controllability 
In the infinite-dimensional case there are several non-equivalent definitions of controllability which for the finite-dimensional case collapse to the one usual notion of controllability. The three most important controllability concepts are:
Exact controllability,
Approximate controllability,
Null controllability.

Controllability in discrete-time 
The interpretation is that  is the state that is reached by applying the input sequence u when the initial condition is zero. The system is called 
exactly controllable in time n if the range of  equals X,
null controllable in time n if the range of  includes the range of An.

Controllability in continuous-time 
In controllability of continuous-time systems the map  given by  plays the role that  plays in discrete-time. However, the space of control functions on which this operator acts now influences the definition. The usual choice is L2(0, ∞;U), the space of (equivalence classes of) U-valued square integrable functions on the interval (0, ∞), but other choices such as L1(0, ∞;U) are possible. The system is called
exactly controllable in time t if the range of  equals X,

Observability 
As in the finite-dimensional case, observability is the dual notion of controllability. In the infinite-dimensional case there are several different notions of observability which in the finite-dimensional case coincide. The three most important ones are:
Exact observability (also known as continuous observability),
Approximate observability,
Final state observability.

Observability in discrete-time 
An important role is played by the maps  which map X into the space of all Y valued sequences and are given by  if k ≤ n and zero if k > n. The interpretation is that  is the truncated output with initial condition x and control zero. The system is called
exactly observable in time n if there exists a kn > 0 such that  for all x ∈ X,
approximately observable in time n if  is injective,
final state observable in time n if there exists a kn > 0 such that  for all x ∈ X.

Observability in continuous-time 
However, the space of functions to which this operator maps now influences the definition. The usual choice is L2(0, ∞, Y), the space of (equivalence classes of) Y-valued square integrable functions on the interval (0,∞), but other choices such as L1(0, ∞, Y) are possible. The system is called
exactly observable in time t if there exists a kt > 0 such that  for all x ∈ X,
approximately observable in time t if  is injective,
final state observable in time t if there exists a kt > 0 such that  for all x ∈ X.

Duality between controllability and observability 
The correspondence under duality of the different concepts is:
Exact controllability ↔ Exact observability,
Approximate controllability ↔ Approximate observability,
Null controllability ↔ Final state observability.

See also 
 Control theory
 State space (controls)

Notes

References